A list of films produced in Belgium ordered by year of release. For an alphabetical list of Belgian films see :Category:Belgian films

2010

2011

2012

2013

2014

2015

2016

2017

2018

2019

References

External links
 Belgian film at the Internet Movie Database

2010s
2010s in Belgium
Belgium